Greg Errico (born September 1, 1948) is an American musician and record producer, best known as the drummer for the popular and influential psychedelic soul/funk band Sly and the Family Stone.

Background
Errico was born and grew up in San Francisco, California. He was a founding member and the original drummer, in December 1966, for Sly & The Family Stone, and in 1971 he became the first member to quit the group, citing the band's continuing turmoil.

Errico toured with jazz-fusion group Weather Report in 1973/74, but never made a studio recording with the group. His performances can be heard on live recordings hosted at the website Wolfgang's Vault. Joe Zawinul said that no one could play his tune "Boogie Woogie Waltz" better than Errico had.

Errico joined the David Bowie band for his Diamond Dogs 1974 tour of the US during September 1974.

Errico later collaborated with bands such as Santana, on Carlos Santana and Buddy Miles Live, released June 7, 1972, and with the Grateful Dead. In 1974 he began drumming for the Jerry Garcia Band on and off thru 1984. He also worked with Larry Graham (from Sly & The Family Stone) plus members of the Tower of Power horns, Journey and the Pointer Sisters on the first album for Betty Davis; Errico produced and drummed. He also produced and drummed on the only album by Ike White (Changing Times). 

Errico still lives in the Bay Area, and continues to play and produce. One of his recent projects was producing the Jamie Davis big band album. He also played at the 2006 Grammy Awards, in the Sly & the Family Stone tribute, alongside most of his former bandmates. In recent years he has played drums for the reformed Quicksilver Messenger Service.

As a member of Sly and the Family Stone, Errico played at Woodstock, and was inducted into the Rock and Roll Hall of Fame in 1993. He continued to tour, with The Family Stone, alongside fellow founding member of Sly and the Family Stone Jerry Martini (saxophone). This band also included former Sly and the Family Stone member Cynthia Robinson (trumpet) before she died in 2015.

Over his career, Errico has played a variety of drum sets, including Slingerland, Ludwig and DW.  He currently plays DW drums and Paiste cymbals.

Errico's intricate drumming, particularly with Sly & the Family Stone, has been sampled on hundreds of occasions by hip hop producers over the years.

A 2014 scientific paper states that Errico is the musician with the highest degree and Pagerank centralities, and the second highest Eigenvector centrality, of all musicians of all time.

Discography

A Whole New Thing – Sly and the Family Stone (1967)
Dance to the Music – Sly and the Family Stone (1968)
Life – Sly and the Family Stone (1968)
Stand! – Sly and the Family Stone (1969)
Woodstock – various artists, (as Sly and the Family Stone) (1970)
There's a Riot Goin' On – Sly and the Family Stone (1971)
Rolling Thunder – Mickey Hart (1972)
Carlos Santana & Buddy Miles! Live! – Carlos Santana and Buddy Miles (1972)
Betty Davis – Betty Davis (1973)
Monkey Grip – Bill Wyman (1974)
Band Wagon – Shigeru Suzuki (1975)
Changing Times - Ike White (1975)
David Soul – David Soul (1976)
Lee Oskar – Lee Oskar (1976)
Stone Alone – Bill Wyman (1976)
Giants – Giants (1978)
Before the Rain – Lee Oskar (1978)
Say It with Silence – Hubert Laws (1978)
My Road, Our Road – Lee Oskar (1980)
The Apocalypse Now Sessions – Rhythm Devils (1980)
Watchfire – Pete Sears (1988)
Snakes & Stripes – Harvey Mandel (1995)
Seven – Enuff Z'nuff (1997)
Red Clay Harvest – Cravin' Melon (1998)
The Closing of Winterland – Grateful Dead (2003)
Garcia Live Volume Five – Jerry Garcia Band (2014)
Cracked Actor (Live Los Angeles '74) – David Bowie (2017)

References

External links
Greg Errico on Unity Music

1948 births
American people of Italian descent
American funk drummers
American rock drummers
American session musicians
American soul musicians
Drummers from San Francisco
Living people
Rhythm and blues drummers
Sly and the Family Stone members
Weather Report members
20th-century American drummers
American male drummers
Jerry Garcia Band members